is a Japanese women's professional shogi player ranked 3-dan. She is a member of the Ladies Professional Shogi-players' Association of Japan.

Promotion history
Funato has been promoted as follows.
 Women's Professional Apprentice League: 1986
 3-kyū: March 17, 1988
 1-kyū: March 29, 1990
 1-dan: March 11, 1991
 2-dan: April 1, 2000
 3-dan: January 2020

Note: All ranks are women's professional ranks.

References

Japanese shogi players
Living people
Women's professional shogi players
LPSA
Professional shogi players from Tokyo
People from Shibuya
1974 births